Don Coscarelli Jr. (born February 17, 1954) is an American film director, producer, and screenwriter. Born to Italian settlers in Libya, he is best known for his work in horror films. His directing credits include the first four films in the Phantasm franchise, as well as The Beastmaster (1982) and Bubba Ho-Tep (2002).

Biography 
Coscarelli was born to Italian settlers in Libya and raised in Southern California. Although his family was not connected with the motion picture business, he was fascinated with cameras and filmmaking at an early age. Long before he was old enough to attend film school, his short films, made with the help of neighborhood friends in his hometown of Los Alamitos, California , were winning prizes on television.

At the age of 19, Coscarelli became the youngest director to have a feature film distributed by a major studio when he sold his independently produced drama Jim the World's Greatest, to Universal Pictures. The film was the first collaboration for Coscarelli with actor Lawrence Rory Guy, who went on to achieve horror icon status under the screen name Angus Scrimm. Jim the World's Greatest was an official selection of the USA Film Festival.

Coscarelli is best known for Phantasm, and its sequels. The original Phantasm was a worldwide critical and box-office success and won the Special Jury Prize at the Festival du Cinema Fantastique at Avoriaz, France.

Coscarelli also co-wrote (with Paul Pepperman) and directed The Beastmaster, which was described by Entertainment Weekly as "a surefire audience favorite." The Beastmaster has spawned two sequels and a television series.

Coscarelli was the recipient of the Bram Stoker Award for Best Screenplay for his film Bubba Ho-Tep, which he also directed. Based on a short story by Joe R. Lansdale, Bubba Ho-Tep stars Bruce Campbell, Ossie Davis, and frequent Coscarelli collaborator Reggie Bannister. In addition to being a critical hit, Bubba Ho-Tep was also a festival favorite, playing prestigious international film festivals like the Toronto International Film Festival, SXSW, Florida Film Festival, Brussels International Festival of Fantasy Films, and the Hong Kong International Film festival. At HBO's US Comedy Arts Festival, Coscarelli was the recipient of the Best Screenplay Award. At Montreal's FantAsia Festival, Bubba Ho-Tep was the recipient of the Best International Film award.

Coscarelli also directed the premiere episode of the American TV series Masters of Horror, titled "Incident On and Off a Mountain Road" and co-wrote the teleplay with Stephen Romano. In 2008, Coscarelli purchased film rights to the horror novel and internet series John Dies at the End by David Wong. The film was completed in 2011, and released in 2013.

In 2018, he published his memoir, True Indie: Life and Death in Filmmaking.

Personal 
Coscarelli frequently collaborates with his wife, costume designer Shelley Kay. His daughter is award-winning vegan chef Chloe Coscarelli.

Filmography 
Jim the World's Greatest (1975)
Kenny & Company (1976)
Phantasm (1979)
The Beastmaster (1982)
Phantasm II (1988)
Survival Quest (1989)
Phantasm III: Lord of the Dead (1994)
Phantasm IV: Oblivion (1998)
Bubba Ho-Tep (2002)
Incident On and Off a Mountain Road (2005, TV, Masters of Horror series)
John Dies at the End (2012)
Phantasm: Ravager (2016) - producer and co-writer
Applecart (2017) - executive producer

Awards

References

External links 

 
 

1954 births
Living people
People from Tripoli, Libya
Horror film directors
American male screenwriters
Libyan people of Italian descent
Libyan emigrants to the United States
American writers of Italian descent
Wilson Classical High School alumni
Film directors from Los Angeles
Screenwriters from California
American people of Italian descent